Barris Industries, Inc. was an American game show production company that was founded by Chuck Barris.

History
Barris founded his company on June 14, 1965 as Chuck Barris Productions.  The company's first series was an unsold pilot called People Pickers. Its first successful program was The Dating Game; it was known for producing other hit game shows such as The Newlywed Game and The Gong Show. The latter title eventually became a movie released by Universal Pictures in 1980. Chuck Barris Productions was incorporated on October 2, 1968. It had its first game show in syndication in 1969, the short-lived The Game Game (credited as Chuck Barris Games Shows, Inc. [sic]). In 1981, Barris renamed Chuck Barris Productions, Inc. as Barris Industries, Inc.

After spending some time in Europe, Chuck Barris returned to the United States in 1984 and formed a syndication arm called Bel-Air Program Sales in October along with Bob Cohen and Brian Firestone, which began syndicating The Dating Game, The Newlywed Game, The Gong Show, The $1.98 Beauty Show and the Barris versions of Treasure Hunt. In 1985, Barris Industries formed an ad-sales barter called Clarion Communications. Later in 1986, Bel-Air Program Sales was renamed as Barris Program Sales, Clarion Communications was renamed as Barris Advertising Sales (a.k.a. Barris National Advertisers), and the production arm Chuck Barris Productions was renamed as Barris Productions.  In 1986, Barris Industries filed a $5 million copyright lawsuit against Lorimar-Telepictures, claiming that the game show Perfect Match was too similar to The Newlywed Game. On March 25, 1987, Barris resigned, left the company, and in the process, sold his shares to Burt Sugarman.

Barris Industries, under the leadership of Burt Sugarman and his company Giant Group Ltd., originally owned a 5.27% stake in Alan Landsburg Productions. In January 1988, Barris Industries merged with the Guber-Peters Company to form Barris/Guber-Peters.  On March 31, 1989, Burt Sugarman sold his shares of Barris Industries to Westfield Group and Northern Star Holdings Ltd., the owners of Network Ten of Australia owned by Frank Lowy for $34.5 million. On September 7, 1989, Barris Industries was renamed as the Guber-Peters Entertainment Company, Barris Program Sales was renamed as Guber-Peters Program Sales, and Barris Advertising Sales was renamed as Guber-Peters Advertising Sales. On September 29, 1989, a day after Sony Corporation of Japan announced to acquire Columbia Pictures Entertainment, Sony announced to acquire the Guber-Peters Entertainment Company for $200 million. The sale was completed on November 9, 1989 after Sony's acquisition of Sony Pictures a day earlier. On November 5, 1990, CPE folded its first-run syndication unit Guber-Peters Television into Columbia Pictures Television Distribution.

As of today, all of the Barris game shows are owned and distributed by Sony Pictures Television, while the Guber-Peters Entertainment Company is still an active in-name-only unit of SPT and Columbia Pictures, known as GPEC, Inc.

List of notable programs

As Barris Industries:
 People Pickers (1965 unsold pilot)
 The Dating Game (1965–1974, 1978–1980, 1986-1989 (as The All-New Dating Game))
 Dream Girl of '67 (1966-1967 and 1986-1987 (as Dream Girl USA))
 The Newlywed Game (1966-1974, 1977-1980, 1985-1989)
 The Family Game (1967 and 1986 unsold pilot)
 How's Your Mother-in-Law? (1967-1968)
 The Game Game (1969)
 Cop Out (1972 unsold pilot)
 The Parent Game (1972-1973)
 Treasure Hunt (1973-1977 and 1981-1982)
 The Bobby Vinton Show (1975-1978)
 The Gong Show (1976–1980 and 1988–1989)
 The $1.98 Beauty Show (1978-1980)
 3's a Crowd (1979-1980)
 Camouflage (1980)
 Dollar a Second (1981 unsold pilot)
 Bamboozle (1986 unsold pilot)
 Comedy Courtroom (1986 unsold pilot)

As Guber-Peters Television:
 Quiz Kids Challenge (1990)
 Countdown (1990 unsold pilot)

Known employees
The longtime announcer for Chuck Barris Productions was Johnny Jacobs, who served from 1965 until his death in 1982.  Jacobs announced for such Barris game shows as The Dating Game, The Newlywed Game, Treasure Hunt, and The Gong Show. Tony McClay is Barris' secondary announcer, as he was sub for Jacobs, most often in 1980 and 1982.

Another announcer was Wheel of Fortune'''s Charlie O'Donnell, who from 1986–1989 announced for The New Newlywed Game, The All New Dating Game, and the 1988 version of The Gong Show, until those incarnations ended in 1989 and he went back to Wheel of Fortune in March.  O'Donnell also served as an announcer for Barry & Enright Productions. A lesser known announcer was Bob Hilton, who was announcer from 1985-1987, announcing The New Newlywed Game and The All New Dating Game.

Perhaps the best-known employee was The New Newlywed Game host Bob Eubanks, who served from 1966–1974, 1977–1980, and 1985–1988, when he stepped down and was replaced by Paul Rodriguez. Eubanks returned to host The Newlywed Game from 1997 to 1999.

Another prominent employee was comedian Chris Bearde, who co-created and co-produced The Gong Show'' in both '70s and '80s versions.

Mark Huffnail was in charge of production for Barris from 1987–1989.

Other companies include
 Chuck Barris Projects
 Chuck Barris Enterprises
 Barris Program Sales
 Barris Advertising Sales

Notes and references

Sony Pictures Television
Television production companies of the United States
Mass media companies established in 1965
Mass media companies disestablished in 1989